Tony Swain may refer to:
 Tony Swain (chemist) (1922–1987), chemist known for his definition of a plant polyphenol
 Tony Swain (musician) (born 1952), pop musician and songwriter